5-MAPDI (also known as Indanylmethylaminopropane or IMP) is an entactogenic amphetamine derivative which is structurally related to MDMA as well as to dihydrobenzofuran derivatives such as 5-MAPDB and 6-MAPDB, and has been sold as a designer drug. It has reportedly been sold over grey-market websites since around 2014, although the first definitive identification was not made until September 2016 by a forensic laboratory in Slovenia.

See also
 IBF5MAP

References

Substituted amphetamines
Designer drugs
Entactogens and empathogens